Gabriela Dabrowski and Xu Yifan were the defending champions, but lost in the quarterfinals to Aleksandra Krunić and Kateřina Siniaková.

Krunić and Siniaková went on to win the title, defeating Eri Hozumi and Alicja Rosolska in the final, 6–1, 7–6(7–3). Siniaková became the sole holder of the WTA no. 1 doubles ranking following the end of the tournament, after previously holding the top ranking jointly with Barbora Krejčíková.

Seeds

Draw

Draw

References

External Links
Draw

Sydney International - Doubles
Women's Doubles